Borba may refer to:

Places
 Borba, Portugal, a municipality in Portugal
 Borba DOC, a Portuguese wine region
 Borba, Amazonas, a municipality in Amazonas state in Brazil, named for the town in Portugal

Other uses
 Borba (surname), a Portuguese surname
 Borba (newspaper) (Борба)
 Borba (Paris), a Paris-based Russian leftwing group
 Borba Blanca, a Spanish wine grape
 Quincas Borba, a novel
 Refers to the grappling only variety of sport sambo (martial art)